Oregon Ballot Measure 90 was a ballot measure in the U.S. state of Oregon to determine whether or not to enact a law changing its primary election. Rather than registered voters associated with both major political parties choosing party nominees, the measure would allow the top two leaders in an "all-comers primary" to proceed to the general election, regardless of party affiliation.

Measure 90 failed to pass, getting unanimously rejected at the county level.

Results

References

External links 

 Save Oregon's Democracy, No on 90 campaign website
 Vote Yes on 90, Yes on 65 campaign website
 Protect Our Vote, No on 90 campaign website
 Ballotpedia on Oregon 2014 Measure 90

2014 Oregon ballot measures